Asia New Singer Competition is a singing competition established by Shanghai Cultural Development Foundation in Shanghai, China, featuring younger and relatively unestablished contestants from many Asian countries, although contestants from Europe and Oceania have also participated and won awards. Some participants like Siti Nurhaliza, Misha Omar and Jaclyn Victor from Malaysia and My Tam from Vietnam would go on to become superstars in their countries. Shila Amzah later rose to fame in Asia after sign a record deal in Shanghai China.

It is usually held with the Shanghai Music Festival, although recent editions have been held in Beijing and Penang, Malaysia.

Summary

Note: the "1st" competition in 1991 featured only Chinese singers and was simply called New Singer Competition (新人歌手大赛). Zhu Hong (朱虹) was the winner.

See also
 Voice of Asia
 Asian Wave
 K-Pop Star Hunt

References

External links
 asiamusic.org.cn

Singing competitions